The 308th Air Refueling Squadron is an inactive United States Air Force unit.  It was last assigned to the 2d Bombardment Wing at Hunter AFB, Georgia.   It was inactivated on 1 March 1960.

The squadron was first active as the 318th Bombardment Squadron, an operational training unit and replacement training unit under Second Air Force during World War II.

In 1945, the 8th Tactical Reconnaissance Squadron was activated as a demonstration unit for air ground support exercises.

In 1985 the three squadrons were consolidated into a single unit.

History

The 318th Bombardment Squadron was established in early 1942 as a Boeing B-17 Flying Fortress heavy bombardment squadron. It was part of Second Air Force as a heavy bomber Operational Training Unit (OTU). The OTU program involved the use of an oversized parent unit to provide cadres to "satellite groups".

The squadron was assigned primarily to airfields in the Pacific Northwest training new units, then becoming a Replacement Training Unit (RTU).  RTUs were oversized units that trained individual pilots or aircrews. It was transferred along with its parent group to Third Air Force in November 1943. However, standard military units, based on relatively inflexible tables of organization were proving less well adapted to the training mission.  Accordingly, a more functional system was adopted in which each base was organized into a separate numbered unit. In this reorganization it was replaced along with other units at Avon Park AAF by the 325th AAF Base Unit (Replacement Training, Bombardment, Heavy) and was inactivated.

In 1945, the 8th Tactical Reconnaissance Squadron was activated as a demonstration unit for air ground support exercises and served in this capacity in the early postwar era.  It was disbanded in 1948.

The 308th Air Refueling Squadron, Medium was activated in 1953 at Hunter AFB, Georgia to provide air refueling of United States Air Force (Primarily Boeing B-47 Stratojet) aircraft using KC-97 Stratofreighters on a worldwide basis.  The squadron deployed to Sidi Slimane AB, Morocco in 1956.  It maintained one third of its aircraft on alert in a test of Strategic Air Command's alert plan later that year. The squadron earned an Air Force Outstanding Unit Award for its performance in this test. In 1959 it was reassigned to the 2d Bombardment Wing at Hunter when the 308th Bombardment Wing became non-operational. It was discontinued in 1960 as Boeing B-52 Stratofortresses supported by Boeing KC-135 Stratotankers assumed the greater portion of the strategic bombardment mission.

The three units were consolidated in 1985 as the 308th Air Refueling Squadron but have not been active since.

Lineage
318th Bombardment Squadron
 Constituted as 318th Bombardment Squadron (Heavy) on 28 January 1942
 Activated on 15 June 1942
 Inactivated on 1 May 1944
 Consolidated on 19 September 1985 with 8th Tactical Reconnaissance Squadron and 308th Air Refueling Squadron as 308th Air Refueling Squadron, Heavy (remained inactive)

8th Tactical Reconnaissance Squadron
 Constituted as 8th Tactical Reconnaissance Squadron on 30 June 1945
 Activated on 15 July 1945
 Inactivated on 3 February 1946
 Disbanded on 8 October 1948
 Reconstituted on 19 September 1985 and consolidated with 308th Air Refueling Squadron and 318th Bombardment Squadron as 308th Air Refueling Squadron, Heavy (remained inactive)

308th Air Refueling Squadron
 Constituted as 308th Air Refueling Squadron, Medium on 15 April 1953
 Activated on 8 July 1953
 Inactivated on 1 March 1960
 Consolidated on 19 September 1985 with 8th Tactical Reconnaissance Squadron and 318th Bombardment Squadron as 308th Air Refueling Squadron, Heavy (remained inactive)

Assignments
 88th Bombardment Group, 15 June 1942 – 1 May 1944
 74th Tactical Reconnaissance Group, 15 July 1945
 69th Reconnaissance Group, 7 November 1945 – 3 February 1946
 308th Bombardment Wing, 8 July 1953
 38th Air Division, 15 June 1959
 2d Bombardment Wing, 1 July 1959 – 1 March 1960

Stations

 Salt Lake City AAB, Utah, 15 June 1942
 Geiger Field, Washington, 1 September 1942
 Walla Walla AAF, Washington, 21 September 1942
 Rapid City AAF, South Dakota, 28 October 1942
 Walla Walla AAF, Washington, 26 November 1942
 Redmond AAF, Oregon, December 1942

 Walla Walla AAF, Washington, February 1943
 Redmond AAF, Oregon, ca. October 1943
 Avon Park AAF, Florida, ca. 9 November 1943 – 1 May 1944
 Stuttgart AAF, Arkansas, 15 July 1945
 Brooks Field, Texas, 10 December 1945 – 3 February 1946
 Hunter AFB, Georgia, 8 July 1953 – 1 March 1960

Aircraft

 Boeing B-17 Flying Fortress, 1942–1944

 Curtiss P-40 Warhawk, 1945
 North American P-51 Mustang and F-6 Mustang, 1945

 Boeing KC-97 Stratofreighter, 1953–1960

Awards and Campaigns
 
 Air Force Outstanding Unit Award 1 November 1956 – 1 February 1957
 
 American Theater of World War II

References

Notes

Bibliography

 
 
 
 
 AF Pamphlet 900-2, Unit Decorations, Awards and Campaign Participation Credits Department of the Air Force, Washington, DC, 15 June 1971

External links

Air refueling squadrons of the United States Air Force
Military units and formations established in 1953